The Network Control Protocol (NCP) was a communication protocol for a computer network in the 1970s and early 1980s. It provided the transport layer of the protocol stack running on host computers of the ARPANET, the predecessor to the modern Internet.

NCP preceded the Transmission Control Protocol (TCP) as a transport layer protocol used during the early ARPANET. NCP was a simplex protocol that utilized two port numbers, establishing two connections, for two-way communications. An odd and an even port were reserved for each application layer application or protocol. The standardization of TCP and UDP reduced the need for the use of two simplex ports for each application down to one duplex port.

There is some confusion over the name, even among the engineers who worked with the ARPANET. Originally, there was no need for a name for the protocol stack as a whole, so none existed. When the development of TCP started, a name was required for its predecessor, and the pre-existing acronym 'NCP' (which originally referred to Network Control Program, the software which implemented this stack) was organically adopted for that use. Eventually, it was realized that the original expansion of that acronym was inappropriate for its new meaning, so a new quasi-backronym was created, 'Network Control Protocol' - again, organically, not via a formal decision.

History
NCP was first specified and described in the ARPANETs earliest RFC documents in 1969 after a series of meetings on the topic with engineers from UCLA, University of Utah, and SRI. It remained in use until the end of 1982; see Flag Day below.

NCP provided connections and flow control between processes running on different ARPANET host computers. Application services, such as remote login and the file transfer, would be built on top of NCP, using it to handle connections to other host computers.

On the ARPANET, the protocols in the physical layer, the data link layer, and the network layer used within the network were implemented on separate Interface Message Processors (IMPs). The host usually connected to an IMP using another kind of interface, with different physical, data link and network layer specifications. The IMP's capabilities were specified by the Host/IMP Protocol in BBN Report 1822.

Since lower protocol layers were provided by the IMP-host interface, NCP essentially provided a transport layer consisting of the ARPANET Host-to-Host Protocol (AHHP) and the Initial Connection Protocol (ICP). AHHP defined procedures to transmit a unidirectional, flow-controlled data stream between two hosts. The ICP defined the procedure for establishing a bidirectional pair of such streams between a pair of host processes. Application protocols (e.g., FTP) accessed network services through an interface to the top layer of the NCP, a forerunner to the Berkeley sockets interface.

Stephen D. Crocker, then a graduate student at UCLA, formed and led the Network Working Group (NWG) and specifically led the development of NCP. Other participants in the NWG developed application level protocols such as TELNET, FTP, and, in the 1980s, SMTP, among others.

Transition to TCP/IP
On January 1, 1983, in what is known as a flag day, NCP was officially rendered obsolete when the ARPANET changed its core networking protocols from NCP to the more flexible and powerful TCP/IP protocol suite, marking the start of the modern Internet.

See also 

 Protocol Wars

References

Further reading

 (now offline, but a later version, which is almost identical to the original version, can be found here)
 (this does not seem to be online, but an early version, which is almost identical to the final version, can be found here)

Stevens, W. Richard. TCP/IP Illustrated Volume I. Reading, Massachusetts, USA: Addison-Wesley Publishing Company, 1994. (v.1). Page 15.

Network protocols
ARPANET

fr:Network Control Program